Nyiha (Nyixa, Nyika) is a Bantu language primarily spoken in Tanzania and Zambia. The language of the 10,000 speakers in Malawi is different enough to sometimes be considered a distinct language.

References

External links
University of Malawi Language Mapping Survey (2006) Contains comparative vocabulary and a short text in Malawian Nyika.
Krüger et al. (2009) "A Sociolinguistic Survey of the Nyiha and Nyika language communities in Tanzania, Zambia and Malawi"

Rukwa languages
Languages of Tanzania
Languages of Malawi